Karl Bohlin (born December 20, 1938) is an American cross-country skier. He competed at the 1960 Winter Olympics and the 1964 Winter Olympics.

References

1938 births
Living people
American male cross-country skiers
Olympic cross-country skiers of the United States
Cross-country skiers at the 1960 Winter Olympics
Cross-country skiers at the 1964 Winter Olympics
People from Dalarna
Swedish emigrants to the United States